Jean-Pierre Lihau Ebua Kalokola Monga Libana, better known as Jean-Pierre Lihau (born 20 January 1975 in Kinshasa) is a DR Congo politician from the People's Party for Reconstruction and Democracy currently serving as Minister of the Civil Service, Administrative Modernization and Innovation in Public Services in the Lukonde cabinet.

He claimed to be the illegitimate son of the country's first president Marcel Lihau.

References 

1975 births
Living people
People from Kinshasa
21st-century Democratic Republic of the Congo politicians
Government ministers of the Democratic Republic of the Congo
Members of the National Assembly (Democratic Republic of the Congo)